Ksi (Ѯ, ѯ) is a letter of the early Cyrillic alphabet, derived from the Greek letter Xi (Ξ, ξ). It was mainly used in Greek loanwords, especially words relating to the Church.

Ksi was eliminated from the Russian alphabet along with psi, omega, and yus in the Civil Script of 1708 (Peter the Great's Grazhdanka), and has also been dropped from other secular languages. It was briefly restored in 1710 and ultimately removed in 1735. While it was no longer used in typographic fonts, it continued to be used by the church, and since clergy actively participated in civil censuses, Ksi can be found in multiple handwritten civil texts all the way until the early 1800s.

In the Civil Script during Peter the Great's time, ksi was also written similarly to an izhitsa with a tail.

It represented "60" if used as a number.

Computing codes

Related letters and other similar characters
X x : Latin letter X
Х х : Cyrillic letter Kha
Ξ ξ : Greek letter Ksi

References

Cyrillic letters